Jarkko Olavi Tontti (born 9 December 1971) is a Finnish novelist, poet, essayist and lawyer. He is former member of PEN International Executive Board and former president of Finnish PEN.

Tontti studied law, philosophy and literature at the universities of Helsinki, Edinburgh, Berlin and Brussels. Doctor of Laws 2002. He has published collections of poems, novels and essays. His first poetry collection Vuosikirja (Book of Years, 2006) won the Kalevi Jäntti literature prize for young authors.

Tontti has worked in the Ministry of Justice, Ministry of Foreign Affairs, Local Court of Espoo, in the Parliament of Finland and at the University of Helsinki. He is a specialist in philosophy of law, freedom of expresion law and copyright law.

His poems have been translated into English, French, Swedish, Italian, Russian, Japanese, Estonian, German, Greek, Slovenian, Latin, Czech, Marathi, Polish, Croatian, Romanian and Portuguese.

Works

Novels
 Haava (Wound, novel, 2021)
 Perintö (Legacy, novel, 2018)
 Lento (Flight, novel, 2013)
 Sali (Gym, novel, 2011)
 Luokkakokous (Class reunion, novel, 2007)

Poetry
 Lain laita (Poems, 2020)
 Jacasser (Jacasser, poems, 2009)
 Vuosikirja (Book of Years, poems, 2006)

Essays
 Tarkoituksista ja keinoista (Means and Ends, essays, 2022)
 Viisastuminen sallittu (Wisening Permitted, essays, 2016)
 Koti, uskonto ja isänmaa (Home, Religion and Fatherland, essays, 2011)

Fantasy Novels
 Vedeera ja polttavan auringon maa (Vedeera and the Land of Burning Sun, fantasy novel, 2022)
 Vedeera vaarallisilla vesillä (Vedeera in Perilous Waters, fantasy novel, 2018)
 Vedeeran taru (The Tale of Vedeera, fantasy novel, 2012)

References

External links 
 The Missing Slate Poet of the Month: Jarkko Tontti 
 Jarkko Tontti – Poetry and translations in Lyrikline.org

1971 births
Living people
People from Tampere
Writers from Pirkanmaa
21st-century Finnish poets
Finnish male novelists
Finnish fantasy writers
Finnish essayists
21st-century Finnish lawyers
Finnish male poets
21st-century essayists
21st-century Finnish novelists
21st-century male writers
University of Helsinki alumni
Alumni of the University of Edinburgh